In mathematics, Schreier's lemma is a theorem in group theory used in the Schreier–Sims algorithm and also for finding a presentation of a subgroup.

Statement

We make the definition that given ∈,  is the chosen representative in the transversal  of the coset , that is, 

Then  is generated by the set

Hence, in particular, Schreier's lemma implies that every subgroup of finite index of a finitely generated group is again finitely generated.

Example 
Let us establish the evident fact that the group Z3 = Z/3Z is indeed cyclic. Via Cayley's theorem, Z3 is a subgroup of the symmetric group S3. Now,
 
 
where  is the identity permutation. Note S3 = { s1=(1 2), s2 = (1 2 3) }.

Z3 has just two cosets, Z3 and S3 \ Z3, so we select the transversal { t1 = e, t2=(1 2) }, and we have 
 

Finally, 
 
 
 
 

Thus, by Schreier's subgroup lemma, { e, (1 2 3) } generates Z3, but having the identity in the generating set is redundant, so we can remove it to obtain another generating set for Z3, { (1 2 3) } (as expected).

References
 Seress, A.  Permutation Group Algorithms.  Cambridge University Press, 2002.

Lemmas in group theory